Government Commissions: BBC Sessions 1996–2003 is a compilation album by the post-rock group Mogwai released in 2005, consisting of sessions recorded between 1996 and 2003 for BBC Radio. Some of the tracks are different from previously released versions – for example, the recording of "R U Still in 2 It?" is entirely instrumental, whereas the studio version on Mogwai Young Team features a lead vocal from Arab Strap member Aidan Moffat. Following the death of BBC Radio 1 DJ John Peel in 2004, for whose show many of the tracks were recorded, Mogwai decided to dedicate the album to him. Peel's voice announces "Ladies and Gentlemen, Mogwai!" at the beginning of "Hunted by a Freak", the album's opener.

In 2012 it was awarded a double silver certification from the Independent Music Companies Association, which indicated sales of at least 40,000 copies throughout Europe.

Track listing

CD

2xLP

Personnel
 Mike Engles, Mike Robinson, Miti Adhikari, and Simon Askew - Recording and Mixing
 Nick Fountain, Colin Beaumont, Nick King, Kevin Rumble, Jamie Hart - Assistant Engineer
 Mark Maxwell - Photo of John Peel

References

External links

Mogwai compilation albums
Peel Sessions recordings
2005 live albums
2005 compilation albums